Forgotten Ellis Island is a documentary film directed by Lorie Conway and narrated by Elliott Gould. A book of the same name by Lorie Conway, designed by Judith Stagnitto Abbate, was published by Smithsonian Books in 2007. The film took 9 years to produce and was supported by three grants from the National Endowment for the Humanities. It portrays the story of the Ellis Island Immigrant Hospital. The work premiered on the Public Broadcasting Service on February 9, 2009.

References

External links
Forgotten Ellis Island
PBS previews Forgotten Ellis Island September 5, 2011

2008 films
American documentary films
Ellis Island
Documentary films about New York City
Documentary films about immigration to the United States
2000s English-language films
2000s American films